Ilya Andreyevich Kablukov (born 18 January 1988) is a Russian professional ice hockey forward. He is currently playing with HC Dynamo Moscow of the Kontinental Hockey League (KHL). Kablukov was selected by the Vancouver Canucks in the 5th round (146th overall) of the 2007 NHL Entry Draft.

Playing career
He was playing with Torpedo Nizhny Novgorod in the Kontinental Hockey League before signed on 21 July with league rival HC Spartak Moscow. Was drafted by the Vancouver Canucks in 2007 but was never signed and had his rights relinquished.

As an impending free agent from SKA after seven seasons, Kablukov was traded to Amur Khabarovsk before he moved to fellow KHL outfit Metallurg Magnitogorsk, signing a one-year contract on 2 June 2020. He was then traded just two days later by Metallurg to Avangard Omsk in exchange for Taylor Beck.

On 29 May 2022, Kablukov signed a one-year contract with his seventh KHL club, HC Dynamo Moscow, for the 2022–23 season.

International play

Kablukov has played for the Russian national team in the World Under-18 Championships. He is a member of the Olympic Athletes from Russia team at the 2018 Winter Olympics.

Career statistics

Regular season and playoffs

International

Awards and honors

References

External links

Ilya Kablukov's player profile at RussianProspects.com

1988 births
Atlant Moscow Oblast players
Avangard Omsk players
HC CSKA Moscow players
HC Dynamo Moscow players
Ice hockey players at the 2018 Winter Olympics
Living people
Medalists at the 2018 Winter Olympics
Olympic ice hockey players of Russia
Olympic gold medalists for Olympic Athletes from Russia
Olympic medalists in ice hockey
Russian ice hockey left wingers
SKA Saint Petersburg players
HC Spartak Moscow players
Ice hockey people from Moscow
Torpedo Nizhny Novgorod players
Vancouver Canucks draft picks